William Boughton (23 December 1854 – 26 November 1936) was an English cricketer. He played for Gloucestershire between 1879 and 1883.

References

1854 births
1936 deaths
English cricketers
Gloucestershire cricketers
People from Westbury-on-Severn
Sportspeople from Gloucestershire